The Nightmare Factory: Volume 2, 2008, is the second volume in The Nightmare Factory series of graphic collections from Fox Atomic Comics, based on the individual short stories of Thomas Ligotti.

Contents
"Gas Station Carnivals", adapted by Joe Harris and Vasilis Lolos
"The Clown Puppet", adapted by Joe Harris and Bill Sienkiewicz
"The Chymist", adapted by Stuart Moore and Toby Cypress
"The Sect of the Idiot", adapted by Stuart Moore and Nick Stakal

External links
Fox Atomic Comics

2008 graphic novels
American graphic novels
Comics based on fiction
Horror comics